VTG or Vtg may refer to:
 Vitellogenin (VTG) a type of protein
 Variable turbine geometry, in variable-geometry turbochargers
 Airline code for Aviação Transportes Aéreos e Cargas, Angola
 Virtual tributary group, in synchronous optical networking
 An airport code for Vung Tau Airport, Vietnam

See also
 VTG-32, a type of video timer produced by FOR-A
 VT Group, a privately held United States defense and services company